Malassezia japonica is a fungus that can cause opportunistic infections in animals.

References

Basidiomycota
Parasitic fungi
Yeasts
Fungi described in 2003